Gianfranco Tommaso Fasano (born 30 June 1961), known professionally as Franco Fasano, is an Italian singer-songwriter and composer.

Life and career 
Born in Albenga, Fasano spent his childhood in Alassio and studied singing and composition with Pippo Barzizza. He debuted at 15 years old recording some songs for a small local label.

Starting from the 1980s Fasano established himself as a successful songwriter, composing songs for Mina, Drupi, Iva Zanicchi, Anna Oxa, Fausto Leali, Peppino di Capri, Fiordaliso and Nicola Arigliano, among others. He also recorded several albums and participated to several editions of the Sanremo Music Festival as a singer.

Since the mid-1990s Fasano specialized in songs for children, and several of his songs won the Zecchino d'Oro festival. He was also artistic director of Radio Baby, a satellite radio station entirely dedicated to music for children.

Discography 
 Album
  
      1990 - Un cielo che non sai
     1992 - Tempo al tempo
     1994 - Qualunque sia la verità
      2000 - Scherzando scherzando
      2012 - fff - FORTISSIMISSIMO

References

External links

1961 births
Living people
People from Albenga
Italian songwriters
Male songwriters
Italian record producers
Italian singer-songwriters